The 1987 NSWRL season was the 80th season of professional rugby league football in Australia. Thirteen clubs competed for the New South Wales Rugby League premiership's J J Giltinan Shield and Winfield Cup during the season, which culminated in the grand final between the Manly-Warringah Sea Eagles and the Canberra Raiders who were the first club ever from outside Sydney to appear in a premiership decider. This season, NSWRL teams also competed for the 1987 National Panasonic Cup.

Season summary
This was to be the last season that the moniker "New South Wales Rugby League" would be actually correct, as the following season two teams from Queensland would be introduced, heralding a new era of interstate club participation in the Winfield Cup premiership (although the name would not be changed to the Australian Rugby League until 1995). This would also ultimately lead to the decline of the historic Brisbane Rugby League premiership of Queensland.

Twenty-six regular season rounds were played from February till August, resulting in a top five of Manly, Easts, Canberra, Balmain and Souths who battled it out in the finals.

Parramatta's captain and halfback Peter Sterling made a clean sweep of the 1987 season's major awards, winning the Rothmans Medal and Dally M Award as well as being named Rugby League Week's player of the year.

Western Suburbs moved their homeground to Campbelltown (Orana Park) this season.

1987 would be the last year in which the NSWRL used the Sydney Cricket Ground for regular weekly matches, including all finals and the grand final. From 1988 league headquarters would move next door to the SCG to the new 40,000 seat, A$68 million Sydney Football Stadium.

Teams
The lineup of clubs remained unchanged from the previous year, with thirteen contesting the premiership, including five Sydney-based foundation teams, another six from Sydney, one from greater New South Wales and one from the Australian Capital Territory, though technically the ACT club, while known as the Canberra Raiders, actually played their home games at the Seiffert Oval in Queanbeyan which is located on the NSW side of the ACT/NSW state border to the south of the city.

Regular season

Bold – Home game
X – Bye
Opponent for round listed above margin

Ladder

Ladder progression

Numbers highlighted in green indicate that the team finished the round inside the top 5.
Numbers highlighted in blue indicates the team finished first on the ladder in that round.
Numbers highlighted in red indicates the team finished last place on the ladder in that round.
Underlined numbers indicate that the team had a bye during that round.

Finals

Chart

Grand final

Manly dominated the 1987 season with a 12-match winning sequence between May and July and Bob Fulton's elusive goal of coaching a side to grand final victory began to look a possibility. The path to glory had been four years in the making. In 1983 Fulton had returned to the club as coach, the second year running that they lost to Parramatta and he set about pursuing a stable of players needed to win a premiership.

The sole survivors of the 1983 loss to Parramatta were Noel Cleal and club captain, Paul Vautin. Vautin had been largely overlooked by the Australian selectors (including being surprisingly overlooked for the 1982 Kangaroo tour after representing both Australia and Queensland earlier that year). Vautin's leadership of the Sea-Eagles was an integral factor in the club's success, though there was allegedly tension between Vautin and Cleal in 1987. Despite still recovering from broken arm suffered on the successful 1986 Kangaroo tour, the Manly club board had wanted Fulton to make Cleal the captain to replace Vautin. Fulton however retained Vautin as captain with Cleal as his deputy. In 1984 young halfback Des Hasler, who had spent several seasons warming the bench at Penrith trialed with the club and became a mainstay of the Manly side having achieved Test selection against New Zealand in 1985 as well as being a 1986 Kangaroo Tourist. 1986 Rothmans medallist, winger-turned-hooker, Mal Cochrane, a reliable goalkicker and a deceptive open runner was also an asset to the side. The forwards were Vautin, "Crusher" Cleal, "Rambo" Ron Gibbs, Kangaroo Tour prop Phil Daley and Great Britain international, Castleford's Kevin Ward, who was flown back out to Australia specifically for the grand final.  Manly's masterstroke was the signing of former rugby union international centre Michael O'Connor from St. George who was the current NSW Origin and Australian test goal kicker.

Their opponents were to be the Canberra Raiders who, after 5 years of competition, had reached their first grand final. The Raiders were co-coached by Kangaroos coach Don Furner and Queensland coach Wayne Bennett who had jointly won the Dally M Coach of the Year award for their efforts in lifting the Raiders from easy beats to premiership contenders. The team included players such as captain Dean Lance, Queensland and Kangaroo Tour fullback Gary Belcher, centres Mal Meninga (himself a test veteran who had returned after breaking his arm against Manly earlier in the year) and Peter Jackson, hooker Steve Walters and front rowers Sam Backo and New Zealand test player (and former NZ Water Polo international) Brent Todd with a young Kevin Walters also on the bench. Also sitting on the Raiders bench for the game as emergencies were young Glenn Lazarus and Laurie Daley, though neither would be used in the grand final.

50,201 fans were on hand on an unseasonably warm day  to watch the last rugby league grand final played at the Sydney Cricket Ground, and the first to involve a club from outside the Sydney area. Network 10 televised a memorable pre-match entertainment involving a symbolic building of a huge model of the Sydney Harbour Bridge by representatives of the Navy's apprentices, while singer Julie Anthony  sang Advance Australia Fair.

Ten's commentary team for the game was Rex Mossop and Graeme Hughes with David Fordham the sideline reporter and special comments from Australian and New South Wales representatives Peter Sterling and Wayne Pearce.

Match report

From the outset Manly's Cliff Lyons attempted to find gaps out wide in Canberra's defence and kept the Raiders hemmed in on their own side of half-way with his astute kicking. Lyons stepped inside the Raiders' defence and after a seventy-metre burst found Noel Cleal stampeding on to the ball but Cleal's final pass to Des Hasler was ruled forward. Another promising Manly raid broke down when Lyons' reverse pass to O'Connor was put to ground.

Manly continued to put pressure on the Raiders defence with both speedsters Michael O'Connor and Dale Shearer trying to catch the Raiders out with long range kicks to their in-goal area in front of the SCG hill, but both were only just beaten to the ball each time by Gary Belcher and Gary Coyne respectively.

In the 27th minute Lyons eventually broke through on his third threatening attempt. Scurrying from a scrum win on the Canberra quarter-line, Lyons brushed off the tackle of Chris O'Sullivan and stepped inside Belcher to score.

The Sea Eagles led 6-0 at half-time, with a ball-and-all tackle by Belcher on Dale Shearer just two metres from the Canberra tryline preventing the lead being greater.

From the restart kick-off Belcher fielded the ball in his in-goal but was penalised for shepherding behind Chris O'Sullivan as he ran the ball out. It was a gift penalty for O'Connor to take Manly out to an 8-0 lead.

The Sea Eagles kept the pressure on Canberra by charging down two attempted clearing kicks by a tiring Mal Meninga. Only occasionally did the Raiders break through. After a run by Peter Jackson, Manly's Phil Daley was penalised for a high tackle and Meninga's goal finally put Canberra on the scoreboard.

Fatigue and the heat began to take a toll on the players, though one of the more surprising efforts was Manly's English prop Kevin Ward who ran and tackled strongly all day. Meninga, who had only played 60 minutes of football since breaking his arm in a game against Manly almost two months earlier, was replaced by Kevin Walters after 15 minutes of the second half and Manly's Gibbs, Cleal and Cochrane all went down hurt at different stages as the pace of the match slowed (for his part, Cochrane still can't remember the second half). Soon after a successful penalty goal from O'Connor, a Dale Shearer cross field kick from the Raiders 22m line was grounded over the line by O'Connor in the Paddington corner. While Manly winger David Ronson was thought to be offside (though he didn't get involved in the play, he was still within 10 metres of O'Connor), many claim that the Manly centre should have been ruled offside as he got the ball "rather quickly" (television replays would prove inconclusive as there was no footage of where O'Conner was when Shearer kicked). However, referee Mick Stone ruled that Manly's international centre was onside and O'Connor was awarded the try. He converted his own try (giving him 4/4 goals at that point) and Manly had a premiership winning 16-2 lead.

A brief hope of a fightback loomed after an ingeniously constructed "trojan horse" move by Canberra. Chris O'Sullivan went down "injured" after being tackled and then miraculously popped up in the next passage of play to take the inside pass from Ivan Henjak and score. With Meninga off the ground, Gary Belcher converted to narrow the scores to 16-8.

Ron Gibbs' return from the head-bin helped snap the Sea Eagles out of their complacency. Daley's tackle on Canberra replacement Terry Regan and Dale Shearer's try-saving tackle on Ashley Gilbert three minutes from full-time ended any chance of a Canberra fightback. Paul Vautin led the charge back up-field with Hasler being bundled into the corner post after a run-around movement with O'Connor. The Manly centre also had a try taken off him just minutes after his previous try when Mick Stone ruled a pass from Cliff Lyons had gone forward.

Right on full-time, O'Connor landed his fifth goal from five attempts after the Raiders were penalised in front of their own posts for being offside after a tap-kick restart. The 18-8 scoreline was a fair indication of Manly's supremacy on the day and a just result considering the Sea Eagles' consistency throughout the year.

Manly became the first team other than Canterbury-Bankstown or Parramatta to win the grand final during the 1980s (Manly had been beaten grand finalists in 1982 and 1983, losing both times to Parramatta).

For Manly coach Bob Fulton, premiership glory in a nine-year coaching career was finally achieved. For the dual Canberra coaches it marked a milestone. It was a sad ending to the long club coaching career of Don Furner, the man who brought Canberra into the competition. For his partner Wayne Bennett, the tactician behind the side, it was a disappointing exit but another door was about to open on his own stellar coaching career with the Brisbane Broncos and a continuing career as Queensland Origin coach.

Player statistics
The following statistics are as of the conclusion of Round 26.

Top 5 point scorers

Top 5 try scorers

Top 5 goal scorers

Manly vs Wigan 

Having won the premiership, the Manly side travelled to England to play British Champions Wigan on 7 October. This was only the second match of its kind, since the first time the Australian and British premiers faced off in 1976. 36,895 spectators turned out at Central Park, Wigan to see the Sea Eagles go down 8 to 2 in a tryless game which saw Ron Gibbs sent off in his last game for Manly following a high tackle on Wigan centre Joe Lydon.

References

External links
 Rugby League Tables - Season 1987 The World of Rugby League.
 Pace, Class and Lots of Guts Soaring Sea Eagles.
Results:1981-90 at rabbitohs.com.au
1987 J J Giltinan Shield and Winfield Cup at rleague.com
NSWRL season 1987 at rugbyleagueproject.org

New South Wales Rugby League premiership
NSWRL season